Ji Mingyi (born December 15, 1980 in Dalian) is a Chinese footballer. He spent the majority of his career with Dalian Shide where he won four league titles and two Chinese FA Cups.

Club career 
Ji Mingyi started his career with Dalian Shide in 1999 where he quickly made an impact within the team establishing himself with 21 appearances in his first season. Injecting fresh blood into the dominate Dalian team, during his career with Dalian he won four league titles and two Chinese FA Cups. After nine seasons with Dalian where he was eventually named captain he transferred to the newly promoted Chengdu Blades. At his new club he would immediately establish himself as vital player within the team for the next two seasons until at the end of the 2009 Chinese Super League campaign it was discovered that the club had fixed a game during their promotion to the Chinese Super League and were subsequently relegated as punishment. 

With the club unable to hold on to Ji, there was speculation that he would join Korean K League side Jeju United FC, however this fell through and he decided to retire from the game. Ji failed to pass the trail with newly established club Dalian Transcendence in 2014. He became the assistant coach of Dalian Yifang as well as the head coach of reserve team of the club. Ji returned to professional football in January 2017, joining China League Two club Hainan Boying as player and general manager.

International career 
Ji Mingyi was named in the 2004 AFC Asian Cup where he was selected as back up for Zhang Yaokun and Zheng Zhi in central defence as China came runners-up within the tournament. Throughout Ji Mingyi international career he has continued to be a reserve choice in defence, the following 2007 AFC Asian Cup he was again selected in the squad however did not play any games.

Career statistics 
Last update: 14 October 2017

Honours
Dalian Shide
 Chinese Jia-A League/Chinese Super League: 2000, 2001, 2002, 2005
 Chinese FA Cup: 2001, 2005

References

External links 

Player profile at Sina website

1980 births
Living people
Chinese footballers
Footballers from Dalian
China international footballers
Dalian Shide F.C. players
Chengdu Tiancheng F.C. players
Hainan Boying F.C. players
Chinese Super League players
2004 AFC Asian Cup players
2007 AFC Asian Cup players
Association football defenders